The South and Central American Youth Beach Handball Championship is the official competition for Men's and Women's Beach handball youth national teams of the South and Central America Handball Confederation.

Men

Summary

Medal table

Participating nations

Women

Summary

Medal table

Participating nations

References

External links
 Coscabal official website
 Page of the tournament in Argentina Handball Confederation website

Recurring sporting events established in 2022